The 1982 Toronto Molson Light Challenge was a tennis tournament, won by Ivan Lendl 7–5, 3–6, 7–6, 7–5 against John McEnroe.

Players

Draw

Finals

Group A

Group B

References

Toronto Indoor
Toronto Molson Light Challenge
Molson Light Challenge